IBS Centers are research centers operated by the Institute for Basic Science. There are 31 institutes as of August 2020. Centers are organized into six disciplines according to their research area:
 Physics
 Chemistry
 Life sciences
 Interdisciplinary
 Mathematics
 Earth science

HQ, campus, and extramural 
As of August 2022, the following HQ, campus, and extramural IBS Centers exist (in alphabetical order):

Pioneer research centers 
Pioneer Research Centers (PRC) are headquarters-based centers headed not by a director, but by a group of up to five chief investigators. As of August 2022, the following IBS pioneer research centers exist (in alphabetical order):

Former centers

See also 
 List of Max Planck Institutes
 List of Johns Hopkins University Research Centers and Institutes
 National Institute for Mathematical Sciences
 RAON

References

IBS Centers
Institute for Basic Science
University research institutes